Dowtu (also Romanized as Dowtū; also known as Dowtūn and Dowtūy-e Aḩmad Khalaj) is a village in Karvan-e Olya Rural District, Karvan District, Tiran and Karvan County, Isfahan Province, Iran. At the 2006 census, its population was 694, in 201 families.

References 

Populated places in Tiran and Karvan County